Salminen is a Finnish surname. Notable people with the surname include:

Arto Salminen (1959–2005), Finnish writer known for his social commentary
Arvo Salminen, Finnish politician
Esko Salminen (born 1940), Finnish actor
Ilmari Salminen (1902–1986), Finnish athlete, winner of the 10000 m at the 1936 Summer Olympics
Juha Salminen (born 1976), Finnish enduro rider
Krisse Salminen (born 1976), Finnish stand-up comedian and television talkshow hostess
Markku Salminen (1946–2004), Finnish orienteering competitor
Matti Salminen (born 1945), Finnish bass and opera singer
Sally Salminen (1906–1976), Finnish author from the Åland Islands
Simo Salminen (born 1932), Finnish comic-actor in movies and television
Timo Salminen (born 1952), Finnish cinematographer best known for his work in Aki Kaurismäki's films
Ville Salminen (1908–1992), Finnish film actor, director, writer and producer
Ville-Veikko Salminen (1937–2006), Finnish actor

References

Finnish-language surnames